Sandoz is a surname. Notable people with the surname include:

Claude Sandoz (born 1946), Swiss visual artist
Edmond Sandoz (1872–unknown), French sports shooter
Edouard-Marcel Sandoz (1881–1971), Swiss sculptor and painter
Ellis Sandoz (1931), American political scientist
Mari Sandoz (1896–1966), American novelist

Franco-Provençal-language surnames